The 1965 Grand National was the 119th running of the Grand National horse race that took place at Aintree Racecourse near Liverpool, England, on 27 March 1965.

It was won by Jay Trump, trained by Fred Winter and ridden by American amateur jockey Tommy Smith. Forty-seven horses ran; the favourite, Freddie, came a close second. The race was attended by Queen Elizabeth The Queen Mother, whose horse Devon Loch almost won the National in 1956, and Princess Margaret.

Finishing order

Non-finishers

Media coverage

David Coleman presented Grand National Grandstand on the BBC. Peter O'Sullevan, Bob Haynes and Peter Montague-Evans were the commentators - Montague-Evans doing his final National commentary.

References

 1965
Grand National
Grand National
20th century in Lancashire
March 1965 sports events in the United Kingdom